The University of Michigan College of Literature, Science, and the Arts (LSA) is the liberal arts and sciences school of the University of Michigan in Ann Arbor. Established in 1841 with seven students and two teachers, the college is currently the largest unit at U-M in terms of student enrollment. It is located on the university's Central Campus. It is also home to the University of Michigan Honors Program. In March 2013 Helen Zell gave $50 million to LSA, the largest gift in LSA history, to support scholarships and stipends for Master's students in creative writing.

History of LSA
The College of Literature, Science, and the Arts was originally designated the Literary Department and was the core of the University of Michigan. From 1841 to 1874, the faculty elected a president that communicated with the regents about department needs. In 1875, Henry Simmons Frieze became the first of the deans of LSA.

Residential College

Founded in 1967, The Residential College (RC) is a division of the College of Literature, Science, and the Arts. Jon Wells is the current director of the RC, and is currently teaching courses in English and African American Studies. 86 faculty and staff at the university are associated with the RC, including nine Academic Advisors and four administrators.

Students in the RC take classes in LSA as well as specially-designed RC courses, many of which are seminar courses with fewer than fifteen students each. All RC students are required to live in the same residence hall, East Quadrangle, for at least their first two years. Since the RC is a part of the LSA, all LSA academic requirements apply to it. In addition to the usual concentrations in LSA, RC students may choose to pursue five additional concentrations (RC website): "Arts and Ideas in the Humanities," "Creative Writing and Literature," "Drama," "Social Theory and Practice," and an option for an "Individualized Major".

A major requirement for RC participation is intensive language training, which consists of two eight-credit courses similar to language immersion, and one four-credit readings course. Intensive Japanese at the RC has no reading courses, and the semi-immersion curriculum consists of two ten-credit courses. Other languages offered include Spanish, French, Latin, German, Japanese, and Russian.

Deans of the Faculty of Literature, Science, and the Arts

 1875–1880 Henry Simmons Frieze
 1880–1881 Charles Kendall Adams
 1881–1882 Edward Olney
 1882–1889 Henry Simmons Frieze

Deans of the Department of Literature, Science, and the Arts

1890-1897 Martin Luther D'Ooge
1897-1907 Richard Hudson
1907-1914 John Oren Reed
1912-1915 John Robert Effinger (acting)

Deans of the College of Literature, Science, and the Arts

1915–1933 John Robert Effinger
1933–1945 Edward Henry Kraus
1945–1951 Hayward Keniston
1951–1952 Burton Doan Thuma (acting)
1952–1958 Charles Edwin Odegaard
1959–1960 Roger William Heyns
1962–1963 Burton Doan Thuma (acting)
1963–1968 William Haber
1968–1970 William Lee Hays
1970–1971 Alfred S. Sussman (acting)
1971–1974 Frank H. T. Rhodes
1974–1976 Billy E. Frye (acting)
1976–1980 Billy E. Frye
1980–1981 John R. Knott (acting)
1981–1989 Peter O. Steiner
1989–1998 Edie Goldenberg
1998–1999 Patricia Gurin (acting)
1999–2002 Shirley Neuman
2002–2003 Terrence J. McDonald (acting)
2003–2013 Terrence J. McDonald
2013-2014 Susan A. Gelman (interim)
2014–2018  Andrew D. Martin
2018–2019  Elizabeth Cole (acting)
2019–Present Anne Curzan

References

External links

Literature, Science, and the Arts
Educational institutions established in 1841
Liberal arts colleges at universities in the United States
1841 establishments in Michigan
University of Michigan campus